Handroanthus chrysotrichus, synonym Tabebuia chrysotricha, commonly known as the golden trumpet tree, is a semi-evergreen/semi-deciduous (shedding foliage for a short period in late spring) tree from Brazil. It is very similar to and often confused with Tabebuia ochracea. In Portuguese it is called ipê amarelo and its flower is considered the national flower of Brazil.

Growth
It has very showy golden-yellow to red flowers in the spring. These are rich in nectar and thus the tree is a useful honey plant. While it is not especially popular with hummingbirds, some of these – e.g. glittering-bellied emerald (Chlorostilbon lucidus) and white-throated hummingbird (Leucochloris albicollis) – seem to prefer them over the flowers of other Tabebuia species.

The golden trumpet tree is grown outside Brasil as a street tree and garden tree. The USDA rates it for hardiness zones 9b through 11, and moderately drought-tolerant.

Concern has been raised that it is becoming a weed in tropical and sub-tropical Australia, though it has not yet been declared.

Taxonomy
A 2007 DNA study of various members classified in the genus Tabebuia showed that the taxon was polyphyletic, and two genera were resurrected to separate these members into three separate clades: Roseodendron, Handroanthus, and Tabebuia. Tabebuia chrysotricha was moved to Handroanthus chrysotrichus, characterized by the hardness of its wood and high lapachol content.

Gallery

References

Further reading
  (2005): Beija-flores (Aves, Trochilidae) e seus recursos florais em uma área urbana do Sul do Brasil  [Hummingbirds (Aves, Trochilidae) and their flowers in an urban area of southern Brazil]. [Portuguese with English abstract] Revista Brasileira de Zoologia 22(1): 51–59.  PDF fulltext
  (2007): Taxonomic Revisions in the Polyphyletic Genus Tabebuia s. l. (Bignoniaceae). Systematic Botany "32"(3):660-670.  abstract
  (2013): Weed Watch: Golden Trumpet Tree Tabebuia Chrysotricha http://www.technigro.com.au/documents/GoldenTrumpetTree.pdf

External links

Tabebuia chrysotricha, Golden Trumpet Tree
Tabebuia chrysotricha / Handroanthus chrysotrichus (Yellow trumpet tree) - JCU
Tabebuia chrysotricha - Golden Trumpet Tree - Plant Finder- Sunset.com
http://www.bioone.org/doi/abs/10.1600/036364407782250652

chrysotricha
Flora of Brazil
Flora of the Atlantic Forest
Trees of South America
Garden plants of South America
Ornamental trees